Garnia may refer to:

 Garnia (protist), a genus of parasitic protozoa belonging to the family Garniidae
 Garnia (weevil), a genus of beetle belonging to the tribe Apostasimerini